The Tianjin Open is an International-level WTA tennis event held at the Tianjin International Tennis Center. The venue has a center court that seats 3,500 people, as well as 12 outdoor courts with lights, four indoor courts and a tennis club.

There are nine WTA-level tournaments in mainland China: WTA Finals in Shenzhen, WTA Elite Trophy in Zhuhai, Premier-level stops in Beijing, Wuhan and Zhengzhou, and International-level stops in Shenzhen, Nanchang, Guangzhou and Tianjin.

Results

Singles

Doubles

See also 
List of tennis tournaments

References 

 
WTA Tour
Hard court tennis tournaments
Tennis tournaments in China
Sport in Tianjin
Recurring sporting events established in 2014